Cha Hyo-sim (born 15 July 1994) is a North Korean table tennis player.

In July 2018, she and South Korea's Jang Woo-jin made history when they won the mixed doubles title at the 2018 Korea Open, beating China's Sun Yingsha and Wang Chuqin 3–1 in the final before a huge crowd. It was their first tournament as partners, and the first international event won by an inter-Korean pair.

References

1994 births
Living people
North Korean female table tennis players
Universiade medalists in table tennis
Universiade silver medalists for North Korea
Table tennis players at the 2018 Asian Games
World Table Tennis Championships medalists
Asian Games medalists in table tennis
Asian Games bronze medalists for North Korea
Medalists at the 2018 Asian Games
Medalists at the 2017 Summer Universiade
21st-century North Korean women